Thomas Colebrooke may refer to:
 Sir Edward Colebrooke, 4th Baronet (1813–1890), British politician
 Henry Thomas Colebrooke (1765–1837), English orientalist and mathematician